The Cape short-eared gerbil (Desmodillus auricularis) is a species of rodent in the family Muridae.  It is the only species in the genus Desmodillus.
It is found in Angola, Botswana, Namibia, and South Africa.
Its natural habitats are hot deserts and temperate desert.

References
 Coetzee, N. 2004. Desmodillus auricularis. 2006 IUCN Red List of Threatened Species. Downloaded on 19 July 2007.

Gerbils
Rodents of Africa
Mammals described in 1834
Taxonomy articles created by Polbot